Augusta Deyanira La Torre Carrasco (29 August 1946 – 14 November 1988), also known as Comrade Norah, was a Peruvian terrorist, recognized as the number two in command of Shining Path. La Torre's influence on her husband, Shining Path founder Abimael Guzmán, is credited with establishing equality for women with regard to participation within the revolutionary organization, and during its militant actions.

Early life and political involvement 

Augusta La Torre was born in Huanta in 1946 into a family with a prominent political lineage. The daughter of Communist party leader Carlos La Torre Córdova and Delia Carrasco, "she grew up in a family where political activity, party membership and protest against the Peruvian state were routine, making it unsurprising that she too entered radical politics." She joined the Peruvian Communist Party in 1962 at the age of 17. She met Abimael Guzmán, a professor of philosophy, through her parents. Guzman was a regular guest to their home in Ayacucho, meeting with La Torre's father to discuss politics. In February 1964, she married Guzman. La Torre also encouraged Guzman to establish the Popular Women's Movement in Ayacucho in 1965.  She was active within the Maoist political organization, Bandera Roja (Red Flag), and helped found the Socorro Popular del Peru (People's Aid of Peru).

Shining Path 

La Torre was instrumental in helping Guzman to create the Shining Path (Sendero Luminoso). On the 24th December 1980, she led the first attack of the Shining Path on a small farm, Hacienda San Agustín de Ayzarca, which culminated on the torture and murder of the farm manager, Benigno Medina and a 19 year old worker named Ricardo Lizarbe. She went into hiding with Guzman in 1978 and died in November 1988, although the circumstances of her death remain unclear. She was succeeded as number two of the Shining Path by Guzman's second wife, Elena Iparraguirre.

References

External links
Peru: Information on Augusta La Torre, wife of Abimael Guzm n, Immigration and Refugee Board of Canada, PER12684, 1 January 1993, at UNHCR Refworld online.
, posted 9 February 2009.

Peruvian revolutionaries
Peruvian communists
Anti-revisionists
Members of the Shining Path
1947 births
Women in war in South America
1988 deaths
Women in warfare post-1945
People from Ayacucho Region
Female revolutionaries